The 2016 NASCAR K&N Pro Series East was the 30th season of the K&N Pro Series East. It began at New Smyrna Speedway on February 14 and concluded at Dover International Speedway on September 30. William Byron was the defending Drivers' Champion. Justin Haley won the championship, 22 points in front of Kyle Benjamin.

Drivers

Notes

Schedule
All of the races in the 2016 season - with the exception of the Biscuitville 125 and JUSTDRIVE.com 125 - were televised on NBCSN and were on a tape delay basis.

Notes

Results and standings

Races

Notes
1 – The qualifying session for the Dover 125 was cancelled due to weather. The starting line-up was decided by Owners' championship.

Drivers' championship

(key) Bold – Pole position awarded by time. Italics – Pole position set by final practice results or Owners' points. * – Most laps led.

Notes
1 – Jesse Little received championship points, despite the fact that he withdrew prior to the race.
2 – Scored points towards the K&N Pro Series West.

See also

2016 NASCAR Sprint Cup Series
2016 NASCAR Xfinity Series
2016 NASCAR Camping World Truck Series
2016 NASCAR K&N Pro Series West
2016 NASCAR Whelen Modified Tour
2016 NASCAR Whelen Southern Modified Tour
2016 NASCAR Pinty's Series
2016 NASCAR Whelen Euro Series

References